Air Force Camp ( – Ardūgāh-e Nīrvī-ye Havāyī) is a village and military installation in Harazpey-ye Shomali Rural District, Sorkhrud District, Mahmudabad County, Mazandaran Province, Iran. At the 2006 census, its population was 35, in 12 families.

References 

Populated places in Mahmudabad County
Military installations of Iran